Doosra is an upcoming Indian feature film directed by Abhinay Deo. The original idea behind the film came from Chicago-based Executive Producers Masha Sajdeh and Rohan Sajdeh, which was then developed into a story and screenplay by Agnello Dias. Two Hollywood writers, Matt Graham and Zak Shaikh were also brought in during development to work on the screenplay.  The film is produced by Masha Sajdeh, Steven Cantor and Jamie Schutz. Doosra is the story of how cricket changed India, seen through the eyes of a young girl. The film is a groundbreaking feature format a fictional narrative weaving with archival footage well-documented incidents from India's political, economic and sporting history at the turn of the millennium.

Doosra is slang for ‘the other one.’  In cricketing terminology, a ball that unexpectedly goes the other way. In the film, Doosra represents a country that overcome centuries old inferiority complex to find its confidence through cricket. And also, a girl who refuses to be defined by what centuries of social tradition expect a girl to be.

Cast 
 Plabita Borthakur as Tara
 Ankur Vikal
 Samidha Guru
 Tvisha Seema
 Krishna Gokani
 Rajeev Ankit
 Mohammad iliyas 
 Kusum Gupta
 Renu Seth
 Akshay Ajit Singh
 Navin Ratawa

Plot
Set between the last decade of the previous millennium and the turn of this one, the film weaves together two stories of courage and identity. One, played out under the harsh glare of the national spotlight by a maverick captain, Sourav Ganguly, and his defiant team. The other, deeply private, in an orthodox household in small town India, where an equally defiant young girl, Tara, takes on social prejudices as she comes to terms with her own mind and body.

Both stories have their principal characters fighting the demons of tradition, classism and orthodoxy. What brings the two narratives to a head is a single event: When Captain Sourav Ganguly pulls off his shirt and waves it bare-chested from the hallowed altar of cricket - the balcony at Lords in London - to celebrate India’s 2002 NatWest final victory against their erstwhile colonial rulers. A defiant celebratory act is suddenly elevated to an iconic image for a nation that finally sheds its centuries of inferiority complex to stand proud and comfortable in its own bare skin.

Music 
The music of the film is composed by Ram Sampath.

References

External links
 

Unreleased Hindi-language films
Indian biographical films
Films about cricket in India
Indian films based on actual events
Sports films based on actual events
Biographical films about sportspeople
Upcoming films
Indian docudrama films
Indian documentary films
Cultural depictions of Indian people
Cultural depictions of cricketers
Films directed by Abhinay Deo